Biswan  Assembly constituency is  one of the 403 constituencies of the Uttar Pradesh Legislative Assembly,  India. It is a part of the Sitapur district and one  of the five assembly constituencies in the Sitapur Lok Sabha constituency. First election in this assembly constituency was held in 1957 after the "DPACO (1956)" (delimitation order) was passed in 1956. After the "Delimitation of Parliamentary and Assembly Constituencies Order" was passed in 2008, the constituency was assigned identification number 149.

Wards  / Areas
Extent  of Biswan Assembly constituency is KCs Biswan, Manpur, PCs Ahamdabad,  Kankarkui, Kauwakhera, Aruwa, Konsar, Kotra, Gurera, Tedawakalan, Nakaila,  Belwa Basahia, Puraini, Bagahadhak, Murthana, Lalpur, Sukhawa Kala, Sanda of  Jahangirabad KC & Biswan MB of Biswan Tehsil; PCs Saraiyan, Patara Kalan,  Daudpur, Mahotepur, Maholi, Lalawa, Saraurakala & Bhithauli of Peer Nagar  KC of Sidhauli Tehsil.

Members of the Legislative Assembly

16th Vidhan Sabha: 2012 General  Elections

See also
Sitapur district
Sitapur Lok Sabha constituency
Sixteenth Legislative Assembly of Uttar Pradesh
Uttar Pradesh Legislative Assembly
Vidhan Bhawan

References

External links
 

Assembly constituencies of Uttar Pradesh
Politics of Sitapur district